Crown green bowls (or crown green) is a code of bowls played outdoors on a grass or artificial turf surface known as a bowling green. The sport's name is derived from the intentionally convex or uneven nature of the bowling green which is traditionally formed with a raised centre known as the crown.

Crown green bowls is played in the Midlands, Northern England, and North Wales.

Game 
The aim of crown green bowls is to roll a set of two bowls from the hand towards a smaller target bowl known as the jack. Rolling the bowl or jack is known as the delivery. When delivering a bowl or jack, the player must place one foot on a mat to ensure that all bowls and jack are sent from the same spot.

A full game comprises a number of ends. An end is where the jack is rolled first. The player sending the jack can choose to deliver it wherever they like on the bowling green. This ability to bowl an end in any direction is a unique feature of crown green bowls. Players then take it in turns to roll each of their bowls towards the jack. An end finishes when all bowls have been delivered. At the amateur level it is usual for several ends to be played simultaneously on one green. If two moving woods meet, both are taken back and the shots replayed. If a moving wood strikes a stationary wood or jack from another end, it is again taken back and replayed, but the bowl struck is replaced where contact took place.

The aim of an end is for a player to finish with their own bowls closer to the jack than those of the opponent. For each bowl that is closer than those of the opponent, a player scores one point. Each player usually has two bowls allowing a maximum of two points on each end. A score of one or two is denoted to the two markers (one from each team, in a team match) by raising one or two hands. The winner of the end delivers the jack in the next end.

Competitive games are usually held between two people with the winner being the first person to accumulate 21 points. An unlimited number of ends are played until someone wins. Variations exist where players can have more than two bowls, games are played to 31 points or more, or players form teams of two or more players.

Bowling green 

Crown green bowls is played on a specially prepared short-cut smooth grass surface known as a bowling green or simply the green (usually 45x45 yards). The green usually has a raised centre known as the crown which can often be as high as 30 centimetres above the edge of the green. The green has a ditch around the edge, and slopes on all sides from the crown towards the ditch. Greens are usually rectangular or square, but L-shaped and circular greens also exist. The surfaces also often feature ridges, hollows and slopes to make the game more difficult. Due to this vast array of historical differences, no rules stipulating the shape, size or height of the crown are laid down by the British Crown Green Bowls Association.

Bowls equipment

Bowls 

In crown green bowls, players use two bowls each. Bowls are also commonly known as woods. There are no requirement for official markings on the bowls although manufacturers branding and the weight of the bowls is common. Players often have their initials marked on one side, or use stickers to identify their bowls. One side of the bowl has an indent or dimple allowing the player to identify by touch which side of the bowl has the bias.

Crown green bowls come in a variety of bias strengths, weights, densities, sizes, materials and colours.  The minimum weight is  but there is no maximum weight.

Bowls are referred to and sold by their weight, and are available from 2 lb 0 oz to 2 lb 14 oz, in 1 oz increments. They were traditionally made from lignum vitae wood but are now manufactured from a composite plastic. Wooden bowls have a variable density throughout their core due to the nature of wood. Plastic bowls have a consistent and regular density throughout and manufacturers can produce bowls in different densities generally known as standard, low density and high density. This means that a smaller bowl with a higher density can be the same weight as a larger bowl with a lighter density.

There are two ways of delivering a bowl: with or against the bias. Sending a bowl with the thumb on the biased side is known as thumb peg and sending a bowl with the thumb on the non-biased side is known as finger peg. The different pegs determine in which direction the bowl will go.  A player delivering the jack is expected to declare which peg is used, but a player delivering a subsequent wood is not.

Jack 

The jack, also commonly known as the block, is a smaller version of the bowls used by each player in a game of crown green bowls and also contains a bias. There are written specifications determining the size, weight and bias strength of jacks. To be able to be used in an official British Crown Green Bowls Association recognised league match or competition, jacks must be black, white or yellow. Other colours are available for use in practice.

Jacks have different markings on each side. On one side there is a single circle with the manufacturer's name and other official lettering. This side of the jack is the side with the bias. The other side has a single circle surrounded by three solid dots or smaller circles indicating the non-bias side. Official jacks must also be stamped with an approved date stamp every seven years to comply with the rules. Jacks measure 9.5 cm (3 & 3/4 inches) in diameter and weigh about 660 grams (1 lb 7 oz).

Mat 

The mat is also known as the footer. It is usually black and has a textured top surface to help with grip. It a simple rubber circular mat measuring 14 cm (4.5 inches) in diameter, and around 0.5 cm (1/8th of an inch) in thickness. When delivering a jack or bowl, the player must place their non-leading foot on the mat.

References

British culture
Sport in the United Kingdom
Bowls